Come Share My Love is the debut studio album by American R&B singer Miki Howard. Released on November 19, 1986 under Atlantic Records label, the album peaked at #171 on the Billboard 200 and #19 on the Billboard R&B Albums Chart. Howard scored her first hit song off debut album when "Come Share My Love" peaked to #5 on Billboard's Hot Black Singles Chart in 1986.

The following singles "Imagination" reaching #13 and "Come Back to Me Lover" at #33, earning Howard three songs from this album charting in the top 40 on Billboard's  Black Singles Chart.

Track listing

Credits
Co-producer – Peter Scherer 
Coordinator [Production] – Diane Connal 
Mastered – Barry Diament 
Photography – Roy Volkmann 
Producer – LeMel Humes

Charts

Weekly charts

Year-end charts

Singles

References

External
mikihowardmedia.com
music.aol.com/song/mikihoward

1986 debut albums
Miki Howard albums
Albums produced by LeMel Humes
Atlantic Records albums